Basketball is one of the most popular sports in Lebanon. The Lebanese Basketball Federation FLB  is a member of the Asian federation FIBA Asia and international federation FIBA and also a member of the Arab Basketball Federation

History

The first time basketball was played was in the mid of 1920's.The Lebanon national basketball team has qualified three consecutive times to the FIBA World Championship in 2002, 2006, 2010 and 2023. The Lebanese national basketball team won the 2010 FIBA Asia Stanković Cup on its home court. They are ranked 24th in the world. The women national team is ranked 61st in the world and currently plays Level I in the FIBA Asia Championship for Women . The Lebanese u-19 national team participated in the 2007 FIBA Under-19 World Championship where they placed 14th.

Lebanese Basketball League
Lebanon's basketball league is the Lebanese Basketball League and there is also a cup competition. 
The most successful Lebanese basketball clubs are Sporting Al Riyadi Beirut and Sagesse for men, having both won the most championships in the Lebanese Basketball League, also the Arab Club Championship, WABA Champions Cup and FIBA Asia Champions Cup and Antranik SC for women, having won the Lebanese Basketball League, Arab Women's Club Basketball Championship and the WABA Champions Cup.

Famous Lebanese Basketball Players 

Fadi El Khatib
Rony Seikaly
Joe Vogel
Jean Abdelnour
Ali Mahmoud
Tony Harb
Chantelle Anderson (woman)
Brian Beshara
Rony Fahed
Matt Freije
Elie Mechantaf
Jackson Vroman

Ghaleb Rida
Omar El Turk
Roy Samaha
Sabah Khoury
Elie Rustom
Daniel Faris
Rodrigue Akl
Julian Khazzouh
Ahmad Ibrahim

Famous Lebanese Basketball Coaches
Ghassan Sarkis
Fouad Abou Shacra
Joe Nebhan Moujaes

FIBA ASIA Champions Cup

Sagesse have won a record of 3 FIBA Asia Champions Cup. In addition, their rivals, Al Riyadi have won 2 FIBA Asia Champions Cups making a total of 5 cups for Lebanon.

See also
Lebanese Basketball League
Lebanon national basketball team

References 

Basketball in Lebanon